John Dickson  Wyselaskie (25 June 1818 – 4 May 1883) was an Australian benefactor and grazier. Wyselaskie was born in Sanquhar, Dumfriesshire, Scotland and died in St Kilda, Victoria.  He is buried at the Boroondara Cemetery, where an outstanding memorial was erected in his honour.

See also

 James Alexander Gibson
 Mars Buckley

References

Australian philanthropists
Australian Presbyterians
1818 births
1883 deaths
People from Sanquhar
Scottish emigrants to Australia
Australian farmers
19th-century philanthropists